Captain Randolph Gordon Erskine Wemyss (11 July 1858 – 17 July 1908) was Laird of Wemyss Castle and Chief of Clan Wemyss.

Family

He was born in Wemyss Castle on 11 July 1858, the eldest son on James Hay Erskine Wemyss and Augusta Millicent Anne Mary Kennedy Erskine, youngest daughter of the Honourable John Kennedy Erskine of Dun in the County of Forfar.
 
He was tutored at home by Revd. John Thomson; minister of St. Adrian's church in West Wemyss, until he entered Eton College in 1873.

Randolph married twice. Firstly Lady Lillian Mary Paulet, daughter of John Paulet, 14th Marquess of Winchester and the Hon. Mary Montagu, on 18 July 1884. There were two children: 
Mary Millicent Erskine-Wemyss, 15 May 1885, married Ernest Caswell Long on 30 April 1917 
Michael John Erskine-Wemyss, 8 March 1888 – 1982, married Lady Victoria Alexandrina Violet Cavendish-Bentinck, daughter of William Cavendish-Bentinck, 6th Duke of Portland on 25 November 1918 
They were divorced in 1898.

His second marriage was to Lady Eva Cecilia Margaret Wellesley, daughter of the William Henry Wellesley, 2nd Earl Cowley on 23 November 1899.  In 1911 Lady Eva hosted suffragette standard-bearer Emmeline Pankhurst at Wemyss Castle on the latter's tour of Scotland, as reported in Votes for Women, the organ of Pankhurst's Women's Social and Political Union.

Military career

In January 1900 he embarked on the steam yacht "Vanadis" for a honeymoon cruise to Egypt and South Africa. The honeymoon, however, was interrupted by the outbreak of the Boer War. Wemyss donated the yacht to the war effort as a hospital ship and he was promoted to the rank of Captain and on 4 September 1900 travelled to Mafeking with Charles Cavendish, 3rd Baron Chesham. He returned from South Africa in July 1901.

Business

Following the early death of his father in March 1864, he inherited the Lairdship and the estates. Day-to-day management was carried out by his mother until he reached the age of twenty-one.

The principal activity on the estate was coal extraction centred on West Wemyss, under the Wemyss Coal Company. A new wet dock was opened in 1872 at a cost of £10,000 (equivalent to £ as of ). Railway schemes were developed to assist the business, and construction of the Wemyss Private Railway from Thornton to Buckhaven began in 1879, and was completed in 1881 at a cost of £25,000 (equivalent to £ as of ).

After his service in the Boer War, business continued in the coalfields on his estates, the docks at Methil and the creation of the Wemyss and District Tramways Company from Leven to Kirkcaldy.

As a benevolent landlord, he provided improved housing for workers. He oversaw the developments at East and Coaltown of Wemyss, and a new village at Denbeath. He personally spent around £75,000 (equivalent to £ as of ), on housing in the parish.

Death

Following a death in November 1907 at the Lochhead and Victoria of a miner, Wemyss, assisted with the underground rescue operations, and developed symptoms from shock and exposure. He never recovered and died on 17 July 1908.  He was buried at Wemyss in the Chapel Garden.
 
In a speech in the House of Commons on 21 October 1909, James Falconer MP for Forfarshire said:- 
“Mr. Wemyss had taken all the risks in developing his property at a cost of £1,000,000. He has provided employment for thousands of men, had provided them with travelling facilities and built dwelling houses which were a model to everyone. The rates paid in respect of the enterprise amounted to £8,000 to £9,000 a year. I know no instance which is so much to be commended from the point of view of anyone interested in the development of the country. It is a real romance of enterprise, which has not been equalled in my time in Scotland.” 

The Randolph Wemyss Memorial Hospital was erected in Buckhaven in his memory at a cost of £10,000, and opened on 28 August 1909.

Publications
1895 "The Maid of Norway and other poems by R. Erskine Wemyss". Published privately.

References

People educated at Eton College
1858 births
1908 deaths
Liberal Unionist Party parliamentary candidates